St Bernard's College was a constituent college of the University of Oxford. Founded by the Cistercian order in 1437 and dedicated to Bernard of Clairvaux, it was suppressed in Spring 1540 during the dissolution of the monasteries and its buildings later used to found St John's College, Oxford.

History 

The College of St Bernard, a monastery and house of study of the Cistercian order, was founded in 1437 and closed during the Dissolution of the Monasteries.

Construction of the college quadrangle started in 1437, though when the site passed to the crown in 1540, the Eastern range was incomplete.

The chapel was built and dedicated to St Bernard of Clairvaux in 1530. It survives, rededicated to St John the Baptist, as the chapel of St John's College.

Alumni 

 Gabriel Donne (died 1558), Abbot of Buckfast Abbey
 Thomas Skevington (died 1533), Bishop of Bangor

References 

St John's College, Oxford
1437 establishments in England
1539 disestablishments in England
Former colleges and halls of the University of Oxford
Cistercian Order